Batakundi or Battakundi is a tourist town located 15 km east of Naran in Mansehra District, Khyber Pakhtunkhwa, Pakistan. It is located in the Kaghan Valley.

Location 
Batakundi is located in Mansehra District, Khyber Pakhtunkhwa. It is situated along the Karakoram Highway (KKH) and is a stop for jeeps. It is the first destination on the Mansehra-Naran-Jalkhad-Chilas Road to Babusar Top.

Tourism and activities 

People often stay at hotels in Batakundi when they are planning their trip across Babusar Top. Batakundi is the last town in Kaghan Valley that stays open all year. Most people visit the locals and take pictures and then leave. Many people visit the town to visit the Batakundi Waterfall. There are many hotels and restaurants in the town.

People 
Most people of Batakundi are Gujjars who are now Hindko speakers.

References 

Populated places in Khyber Pakhtunkhwa
Populated places in Mansehra District